Red Right 88 was a passing play called by the Cleveland Browns during the January 4, 1981 American Football Conference divisional playoff game against the Oakland Raiders; in the years since, the term has been used to refer to the game itself and its ending.

Game summary
Near the end of the quarter, Browns quarterback Brian Sipe's 20-yard completion to Reggie Rucker sparked a drive that reached inside the Raiders' 30-yard line, but it ended with no points early in the second quarter when Don Cockroft missed a field goal attempt from 47 yards. On Oakland's ensuing drive, quarterback Jim Plunkett lost a fumble while being sacked, but their defense kept the Browns in check and Cockroft missed another field goal attempt, this one from 30 yards out.

With 6:02 left in the second quarter, Bolton scored the first points of the day by recording his second interception of Plunkett and returning it 42 yards to the end zone. However, Cockroft's ensuing extra point was blocked by Ted Hendricks. After an exchange of punts, Oakland managed to get on the scoreboard, with Plunkett completing passes to Bob Chandler and Raymond Chester for gains of 15 and 26 yards highlighting a 64-yard scoring drive. Mark van Eeghen finished the drive with a 1-yard touchdown run with 18 seconds left in the half, making the score 7–6.

On Cleveland's opening drive of the second half, a 28-yard kickoff return to the 40-yard line by Charles White started a 48-yard drive that ended with Cockroft's 30-yard field goal, giving the lead back to the Browns, 9–7. After forcing a punt, Cleveland drove to the Raiders' 24-yard line, but on a field goal attempt, holder Paul McDonald was unable to handle a bad snap and was tackled for an 11-yard loss. On their next drive on the Raiders' 44 yard line after a punt, Cleveland drove to the 9 yard line, featuring a 21-yard reception by Dave Logan.  The drive ended with another 30-yard field goal by Cockroft, making the score 12–7 going into the fourth quarter.

Early in the final quarter, the Raiders took a 14–12 lead with an 80-yard drive highlighted by Chester's 27-yard catch. On the last play, van Eeghen scored his second 1-yard touchdown run of the day. The Raiders had a chance to put the game away when they recovered a fumble from Sipe on the Browns' 24-yard line with 4:19 left in the game. But on 3rd down with 1 yard to go at the Browns' 15-yard line, van Eeghen was stuffed for no gain on two consecutive plays, and Cleveland regained the ball on downs. On the second play of the ensuing drive, Sipe completed a 29-yard pass to tight end Ozzie Newsome, and four plays later connected on a 23-yard pass to Greg Pruitt. Then Mike Pruitt ran the ball 14 yards to the Raiders' 14-yard line. Pruitt gained another yard on the next play, and the team called a timeout with 49 seconds left.

The play
Trailing 14–12 with less than a minute remaining in the game, the Browns had the ball on the Raiders' 13-yard line and were in position for a potential game-winning field goal. Sipe conferred with head coach Sam Rutigliano, who called a pass play, "Red Slot Right, Halfback Stay, 88," and instructed Sipe to "throw it into Lake Erie" (throwing the ball out of play as it was only 2nd down), if the play was anything less than wide open. On the next play, Sipe forced a pass to tight end Ozzie Newsome.  However, it was intercepted in the end zone by Raiders safety Mike Davis, who had cut in front of Newsome's square-out pass route, putting an end to the Browns' season. Oakland subsequently advanced to the AFC conference championship, where they defeated the San Diego Chargers and went on to win Super Bowl XV against the Philadelphia Eagles.

The logic behind trying for the touchdown was that Cockroft, the Browns' placekicker, had previously missed two field goal attempts, had one extra point attempt blocked, and had another aborted following a bad snap. In addition, the weather was brutally cold and windy. "What many people don't know about that situation is that I was a long way from being 100 percent physically in 1980," Cockroft said in a 2006 interview. "I had two herniated discs and needed four epidurals to just get through the season. I probably should have gone on IR [the injured reserve list]." Cockroft was released by the Browns at the end of their 1981 training camp and retired soon after. In an NFL Films retrospective on the game, one of Mike Davis' teammates laughed over the play because Davis (an outstanding tackler and team leader) had notoriously poor hands and had often dropped potential interceptions during his career, only for Davis to make the biggest stop of his career by making a difficult catch during freezing, windy weather when it mattered the most. 

Had the play been executed properly, it may have resulted in a touchdown. The primary receiver, Dave Logan, was crossing left-to-right, had a step on his defender, and was open at the 6-yard line. Sipe misread the defensive back's movements and thought Logan was covered so he threw to the secondary receiver and it was intercepted.  Furthermore, this drive had occurred right after the Raiders also eschewed a short field goal attempt, choosing to run the ball on 3rd and 4th down at the Browns' 15-yard line only to get stuffed for no gain each time.

The play call itself has since become an infamous part of Cleveland sports lore, ranking with The Drive, The Fumble, The Catch, Game 7 of the 1997 World Series, The Shot, The Decision, and The Move as a bad memory that symbolizes the 52-year professional championship drought that plagued the city until the Cleveland Cavaliers won the 2016 NBA Finals.

See also
Cleveland sports curse
1980–81 NFL playoffs
The Fumble
The Drive 
Cleveland Browns relocation to Baltimore

References

1980 National Football League season
National Football League playoff games
Cleveland Browns postseason
Oakland Raiders postseason
American football incidents
January 1981 sports events in the United States
1981 in sports in Ohio